RCAF Station Sea Island was a World War II, British Commonwealth Air Training Plan station located near Vancouver, British Columbia.

History

World War II
No 8 Elementary Flying Training School (EFTS) formed here on 22 July 1940.

Aerodrome information
The aerodrome was listed as under construction usable and three runways were listed as follows:

Postwar
After the war the station was renamed RCAF Station Vancouver.

No 442 Squadron was re-activated as No 442 "City of Vancouver" Auxiliary Fighter Squadron at Sea Island 15 April 1946, but was later re-designated an Auxiliary Transport Squadron. No 123 Rescue Flight and NO 121 Composite Flight (KU) were also formed at Sea Island.

On 1 December 1951, No 442 Squadron was split in half to form No 443 "City of New Westminster" Squadron.

RCAF Station Vancouver closed on 31 March 1964.

Today this area is the site of Vancouver International Airport.

References

 Bruce Forsyth's Canadian Military History Page

Royal Canadian Air Force stations
RCAF Station Sea Island
Military airbases in British Columbia
Military history of British Columbia